Semi Kunabuli Kunatani  (born 27 October 1990) is a Fiji rugby union player. He plays for the Fiji sevens team and also Top 14 side Castres . He previously played for Top 14 side, Stade Toulousain and Premiership Rugby side Harlequins. Kunatani debuted for Fiji in 2013 Dubai Sevens tournament.

Career
Kunatani started his career playing rugby in the local 7's competition. He played for the Yamacia 7's side  and was selected by Ben Ryan to represent the Fiji National Sevens side in Dubai 2013, following the 2013 win at the Bayleys Fiji Coral Coast Sevens where he was a stand out player.

Semi's highs this 2014–2015 World Rugby Sevens season include having scored a total of 37 tries in the series thus far, being named in three World Rugby Dream Teams' (Gold Coast, Las Vegas and Glasgow) and most recently Semi was recognised by Sir Gordon Tietjens when he was named by Sir Gordon in his Hong Kong 7s Dream Team. Listing Semi Kunatani on his bench in an all time Best Sevens team, joining the likes of Waisale Serevi, Jonah Lomu, David Campese, Eric Rush and many other greats of the game.

Semi has signed with Toulouse in the French T14, beginning his career in the 2015–16 season and will continue to represent Fiji Sevens if and when selected by national coach Ben Ryan.

Semi became an Olympian at Rio 2016 playing in all 6 matches of the Olympics and helping Fiji win their first ever Olympic gold medal when Fiji thrashed Great Britain 43-7 in the final.  Semi was a major factor in the final playing a significant role in 4 tries of the first half.  This saw Semi join Osea KOLINISAU and Josua Tuisova in the Rio 7s Dream Team.

On 25 August 2018, Kuntani travels to England to join Harlequins in the Gallagher Premiership from the 2018-19 season.

He rejoined the Top 14 when he signed for Castres ahead of the 2020–21 season.

Kunatani was part of the Fiji sevens team that won a silver medal at the 2022 Commonwealth Games.

Statistics

World Rugby Sevens Series

Awards and honours
After the 2016 Summer Olympics, Kunatani was awarded the Officer of the Order of Fiji.

References

External links

 Toulouse Profile
 sporple bio
 Zimbio bio
 The X factor
 

Fiji international rugby union players
Living people
Fijian rugby union players
Fiji international rugby sevens players
I-Taukei Fijian people
1990 births
Rugby sevens players at the 2016 Summer Olympics
Olympic rugby sevens players of Fiji
Olympic gold medalists for Fiji
Male rugby sevens players
Olympic medalists in rugby sevens
Medalists at the 2016 Summer Olympics
Stade Toulousain players
Harlequin F.C. players
Expatriate rugby union players in France
Fijian expatriate rugby union players
Fijian expatriate sportspeople in France
Expatriate rugby union players in England
Fijian expatriate sportspeople in England
Commonwealth Games medallists in rugby sevens
Commonwealth Games silver medallists for Fiji
Rugby sevens players at the 2018 Commonwealth Games
Sportspeople from Nadi
Tel Aviv Heat players
Rugby union flankers
Rugby sevens players at the 2022 Commonwealth Games
Medallists at the 2018 Commonwealth Games
Medallists at the 2022 Commonwealth Games
Fijian expatriate sportspeople in Israel
Expatriate rugby union players in Israel
Castres Olympique players